Aerodrom (meaning Airport or Aerodrome) is the largest in population of the ten municipalities that make up the city of Skopje, the capital of North Macedonia.

Geography
Aerodrom borders Kisela Voda Municipality to the southwest, Centar Municipality to the northwest, Gazi Baba Municipality to the northeast, and Studeničani Municipality to the south.

Demographics

According to the last national census from 2021, Aerodrom has 77,735 inhabitants. Ethnic groups in this municipality include:

The total number of students in the municipality in 2011, in comparison to the total number of students in 2007, increased for 

9.9%. Aerodrom is the first municipality in 

Macedonia by rise of the total number of students.[4]

Sport
 MZT Skopje is the most popular club in Aerodrom. The club competes in the Macedonian First League and Adriatic League. The club's home ground is Jane Sandanski Arena. MZT is a six-time champion of North Macedonia.
 Gorno Lisiče is a football club from Gorno Lisiče neighbourhood. The club competes in the Second Macedonian Football League. The club currently plays at the Cementarnica Stadium in Kisela Voda Municipality.

References

External links

 Official website 

Aerodrom Municipality, Skopje
Municipalities of North Macedonia
Municipalities of Skopje